Stroitel Stadium is a multi-purpose stadium in Soligorsk, Belarus. It is currently used mostly for football matches and is the home ground of Shakhtyor Soligorsk. The stadium was built in 1976 and it currently holds 4,200 people.

References

External links
Stadium profile at Shakhtyor Soligorsk website
Stadium profile at pressball.by

Football venues in Belarus
Buildings and structures in Minsk Region
Multi-purpose stadiums in Belarus
FC Shakhtyor Soligorsk